KRDC (1110 kHz) is a commercial AM radio station licensed to Pasadena, California, serving Greater Los Angeles as a full-time simulcast of ESPN Radio affiliate KSPN. The station is owned and operated by The Walt Disney Company and is the only remaining radio property to be owned by the conglomerate under the ABC, Inc. subsidiary. As a simulcast of KSPN, KRDC is effectively programmed by Good Karma Brands, that station's owner.

KRDC was broadcast in the HD (hybrid) format until late 2014 when all Radio Disney affiliates were sold except for the Los Angeles station which returned to analog transmissions. KRDC is still licensed for digital (HD) operation.

For 18 years, AM 1110 was the flagship station for Radio Disney, carrying the main service from 2003 to 2017 as KDIS, then Radio Disney Country from 2017 to its late 2020 shutdown as KRDC; since then, KRDC has simulcast KSPN (a former sister station until it was sold to Good Karma Brands).

1110 AM is a United States clear-channel frequency; to protect KFAB in Omaha, Nebraska, KRDC reduces power to 20,000 watts and switches to a directional signal at night.

History
The station initially signed on as KPAS in 1942, a station featuring popular music. J. Frank Burke (Publisher-Editor) had owned the Santa Ana Register, buying in 1927, selling in 1935, and was the original KPAS licensee. Loyal Kletzein King (Business Manager) was J. Frank Burke's accountant and married to his daughter, Mary Burke King (Associate Editor). J. Frank Burke sold to William Dumm in 1945, who sold to Loyal King two years later. J. Frank Burke owned both KFVD and KPAS, and the FCC later gave notice to dispose of one of the stations.

The Lamplighter Jazz Sessions were KPAS half-hour broadcasts from late in 1944 to early 1947, sponsored by the Coast Guard and was hosted by jazz writer Ted Yerxa, Lamplighter columnist for The Los Angeles Daily News.

In 1945 it took the call sign KXLA, becoming one of the earliest full-time country music stations. On-air personalities included Jim Hawthorne, Bob Wills, Tennessee Ernie Ford, and Stan Freberg. The station originally broadcast from its El Monte transmitter site, near Santa Anita Avenue and the Pomona Freeway, in the vicinity of the Peck Road exit.

KRLA (1959–2000)

The station became KRLA, "The Big 11-10", on September 1, 1959, and quickly became one of the top radio stations in the Los Angeles area. The on-air personalities included Dave Hull (The Hullabalooer), Emperor Bob Hudson, Ted Quillin, Rebel Foster, Jimmy Rabbitt, Casey Kasem, Bob Eubanks, Dick Biondi, Sam Riddle, Dick Moreland, Jimmy O'Neill, Wink Martindale, Johnny Hayes and Sie Holliday. In 1968, Lew Irwin became news director in order to create The Credibility Gap, which broadcast topical comedy along with the news.  In 1969, John Gilliland debuted the Pop Chronicles music documentary. KHJ (AM) countered with "The History of Rock and Roll," a 48-hour “rockumentary” that chronicled the evolution of Rock and Roll, on Friday February 21, 1969 at 12 noon, the beginning of a Washington’s Birthday holiday weekend. The 1969 film The Model Shop featured a radio newscast by KRLA newsman Ralph Thompson. During the 1960s, the KRLA studio was in an old carriage house just off the parking lot of the old Huntington Sheraton Hotel on Oak Knoll Drive in Pasadena, making it possible to drop by and watch the on-air DJ do his show, those who did were called "porch people" by the staff. When Dave Hull was fired, "Porch people" and other listeners staged a sit-in. When the station switched to oldies, KRLA was noted for its prominence in Southern California Chicano culture. One of the highlights of this station was the Big 11 Countdown Show hosted by Johnny Hayes, with stories and facts about the songs and the artists, as well as the historical events that were going on at that time. The show also included a trivia question that Hayes asked for people to call in with their answer in order to win a prize.  Each day's show counted down the top 11 songs from that date in a previous year as well as a few extras.

In 1962, the Federal Communications Commission deleted KRLA's license for airing fraudulent contests.

Monterey International Pop Festival was broadcast live on KRLA from the Monterey Fairgrounds.

Art Laboe co-owned KRLA with Bob Hope in the 1970s.

The station evolved to an adult contemporary format by 1982, and focused on oldies by 1983. They dropped current music in 1984, electing to play the oldies of the late 1950s, 1960s, and 1970s.

By 1994, KRLA leaned towards an urban oldies format.

On February 25, 1997, CBS Radio announced that it would trade WMMR in Philadelphia, and WOAZ and WBOS in Boston to Greater Media in exchange for KRLA and sister station KLSX, as part of its acquisition of Infinity Broadcasting Corporation. The swap was completed on August 22.

At Noon on November 30, 1998, KRLA abandoned music entirely and went all talk. As a talk radio station, KRLA featured many cast-offs from KABC, such as Michael Jackson and Ken Minyard, as well as Don Imus, Dr. Toni Grant, G. Gordon Liddy, Ron Barr's Sports Byline USA, and Ed Tyll. The station also aired play-by-play of the Kings and Angels.

KSPN (2000–2002)
In 2000, Infinity sold KRLA (alongside KRAK in Sacramento) to the Burbank-based Walt Disney Company due to ownership limits. On December 1, the station became the ESPN Radio outlet for the Los Angeles market (as KSPN). Disney completed the acquisition on March 1, 2001.

KDIS (2003–2017)
AM 710 and 1110 swapped formats on January 1, 2003, with the sports format moving to 710, and Radio Disney moving to 1110 (a change made reportedly because the 1110 signal could not be heard in Orange County at night, when most Anaheim Angels games are played).

In May 2014, Mediabase moved KDIS to the Top 40/CHR panel, although Radio Disney was still considered a children's station.

On August 13, 2014, it was revealed that all of Radio Disney's remaining stations, excluding KDIS, were to be sold in an effort to focus more on digital distribution of the Radio Disney network. KDIS was retained to serve as the originator of Radio Disney's programming, and its operations were assumed by the network's national staff.

KRDC (2017–Present)

On June 9, 2017, KDIS changed call letters to KRDC and flipped to a country format as "Radio Disney Country", becoming the first terrestrial radio station carrying the formerly online-only platform. KRDC also added a translator, 99.1 K256CX, which broadcasts from KRDC's transmitter in Irwindale. The children's radio/contemporary hit radio hybrid continued in the market on KRTH's HD2 subchannel until Entercom's deal with Radio Disney expired at the end of May 2018.

On December 3, 2020, Disney announced that Radio Disney and Radio Disney Country will be shut down in the first quarter of 2021. As part of the process, KRDC will be put up for sale.

Radio Disney Country ceased operations at noon on December 31, 2020 with the station switching back to the main Radio Disney feed until its shutdown; while the network was slated to shut down in the first quarter of 2021, the station's AM feed continued to play an automated playlist of songs from throughout Radio Disney’s history until April 14, 2021. The final song broadcast was Natasha Bedingfield's "Unwritten". The station’s feed was previously available on iHeartRadio until it was removed sometime in March 2021.

Following the end of the Radio Disney feed, KRDC simulcasts KSPN, the ESPN Radio affiliate for Los Angeles, pending a station sale. KRDC also serves as an overflow station for several sports teams in the Los Angeles area. The station airs Los Angeles Lakers broadcasts in the event that KSPN airs a Los Angeles Rams game and Los Angeles FC matches when KSPN airs the Lakers, Rams, or Angels. The station formerly aired Anaheim Ducks games in the event that KLAA broadcast a Los Angeles Angels game until the end of the 2021–22 NHL season; the following season, Ducks radio broadcasts moved to Ducks Stream, an online station available via TuneIn.

Transmitter
In 1987, KRLA moved its transmitter site from South El Monte to Irwindale, where a similar antenna array was installed.
During the 1990s, KRLA was authorized to increase nighttime power from 10,000 to 20,000 watts. When the power increase went into effect, KRLA started broadcasting from the new transmitter site in Irwindale. This is a few miles north of the old El Monte site.

The El Monte transmitter building still stands as a shell. The entire inside is burned out; however, there are still clues to its historic past, namely the first incarnation of its directional antenna arrays (four in-line 135-degree towers, one days, four nights), the second incarnation (four 135-degree towers in a parallelogram, days and a 90-, two 135-, and a 180-degree towers, nights), and the last incarnation, with seven total towers, four days and four nights, with one tower in common, days and nights). There are numerous ducts to keep the equipment cool and an underground channel to divert the cooling water for the transmitters. A well nearby supplied the water. Still visible is the wooden archway where the transmission cables gently bent toward underground conduits running to the transmission towers in the nearby field. All that remains of these towers are the concrete pylons, all aligned as described.

The present Irwindale site includes five 135-degree towers, two days and four nights, with one in common. The significantly northern location, relative to the old El Monte site, allows the large "Inland Empire" to be served with 50,000 watts and only two towers, not four, days, and the greater Los Angeles metro to be served with 20,000 watts and four towers, nights.

K256CX

K256CX is a broadcast translator licensed to Pasadena. The transmitter is located in Irwindale. The station went on the air June 9, 2017, and rebroadcasts KRDC on 99.1 MHz.

History
The Federal Communications Commission (FCC) granted an original construction permit on December 6, 2013, to build an FM translator (K293BZ, now K256CX) licensed in Beaumont, California, and located in the 106.5 MHz frequency, which would rebroadcast KWVE-FM in San Clemente.

On October 18, 2016, KDIS's licensee ABC Radio Los Angeles Assets agreed to acquire from the Calvary Chapel Costa Mesa the permit with the intention to rebroadcast the AM station for $45,000. On November 8, the FCC, as part of the AM revitalization program, granted a modification to move the transmitter location to Irwindale (although the translator will maintain Beaumont as its license city) and change the frequency to 99.1.
The transaction was closed on February 7, 2017.

Following the launch of K256CX and KDIS' switch to Radio Disney Country as KRDC on June 9, 2017, Mount Wilson FM Broadcasters, owner of existing country music station KKGO, said in a statement welcoming the station that the translator would mainly cover the San Gabriel Valley and that the FCC had also authorized another station on the 99.1 FM frequency in Long Beach.

References

External links
FCC History Cards for KRDC

 
 
 The "KRLA Beat" website, one of America's earliest rock-n-roll newspapers

 

RDC (AM)
Disney radio stations
ESPN Radio stations
Radio stations established in 1942
1942 establishments in California